Hang On for Your Life is the second album by the group Shooting Star. The song Flesh And Blood featured a violin solo, an unusual sound in an up-tempo rock song. American AOR radio stations embraced the record; the songs Hang On for Your Life, Hollywood, Breakout, and Are You on My Side along with Flesh and Blood, all received airplay. This was the last Shooting Star album to feature the original lineup, as founding keyboardist Bill Guffey departed the band following its release.

Track listing

Personnel
Van McLain – guitars, lead vocals
Gary West – lead vocals, guitars, keyboards
Bill Guffey – keyboards
Steve Thomas – drums
Ron Verlin – bass
Charles Waltz – violin, keyboards, vocals

References

1981 albums
Shooting Star (band) albums